The 2014 Cheez-It 355 at The Glen was a NASCAR Sprint Cup Series stock car race that was held on August 10, 2014, at Watkins Glen International in Watkins Glen, New York. Contested over 90 laps on the  road course, it was the 22nd race of the 2014 NASCAR Sprint Cup Series. A. J. Allmendinger won the race, his first career Sprint Cup victory. Marcos Ambrose finished second while Kurt Busch, Kyle Larson (the highest finishing rookie) and Carl Edwards rounded out the top five. Behind Larson, the top rookies of the race were Austin Dillon in 16th, just ahead of Justin Allgaier.

Previous week's race
Despite having Kevin Harvick filling his rearview mirror, Dale Earnhardt Jr. was able to maintain the lead to complete the first Pocono sweep since Denny Hamlin in 2006. Earnhardt Jr. reflected on the sweep, stating that his team "definitely went home from the last race and made our car better" and that's what I'm proud of this team for". He also praised the strategy of his crew chief, Steve Letarte. Harvick was impressed with his car's speed in both Pocono races, and that his team "were able to capitalize on it and get a good finish".

Report

Background

The course, Watkins Glen International, is one of two road courses to hold NASCAR races on the Cup Series circuit, the other being Sonoma Raceway. Kyle Busch was the defending race winner from the 2013 race.

Entry list
The entry list for the Cheez-It 355 at The Glen was released on Monday, August 4, 2014 at 12:25 p.m. Eastern time. Forty-three drivers were entered for the race.

Practice

First practice
A number of drivers spun out during the first session. Danica Patrick changed engines during the session and was forced to start from the rear of the field.

Final practice
Patrick crashed her car in turn 5 and was forced to go to a backup car. NASCAR began cracking down on drivers for blend line violations during the practice sessions. Aric Almirola, Michael Annett, Clint Bowyer, Austin Dillon and Ryan Newman were issued penalties for blend line violations. Following the session, series leader Jeff Gordon stated that "for years we have not had that", but with the introduction of a new qualifying procedure in the 2014 season, Gordon also noted that "sometimes you just forget, but to me it's about going along with those procedures during practice and your spotter reminding you when you go out and practice; where those blend lines are and what the procedure is and just getting into a rhythm of it".

Qualifying

Gordon had set Watkins Glen as a priority in his 2014 campaign, as he felt he had "run so poorly here recently" and that his team "loses confidence in their car and you get off track and lost a little bit. That's the way it's been for us the last few times we've been here, the last several times". Marcos Ambrose joined Gordon on the front row, 0.173 seconds in arrears. He joked about Gordon beating him to pole, stating that he wished "Jeff was a little kinder to me to let me get the pole", but did state that "it was a pretty good lap though and I will take it".

Qualifying results

Race

First half

Start
Prior to the start of the race, Greg Zipadelli, vice president of competition for Stewart-Haas Racing, announced that Stewart would not race and Regan Smith would drive in his place. Zipadelli confirmed pre-race that Stewart "feels strongly this is the right thing to do" and that his Stewart-Haas Racing team supported and agreed with his decision. As a result of the driver change, Smith started from the rear of the field. The race was scheduled to start at 1:19 p.m. Eastern time, but the race started five minutes late with Jeff Gordon leading the field.

Kevin Harvick made an unscheduled stop on lap four to remove a bean bag from his car. Paul Menard also made an unscheduled stop for a fluid leak and took his car to the garage. Cole Whitt brought out the first caution of the race on lap 10 after his brakes locked up and he collided head on into the tire barrier in turn 1. The race restarted on lap 15, with Gordon still leading. The next lap, Brad Keselowski made contact with Matt Kenseth in turn 1 and the grill of his car caved in. Kyle Larson was running 23rd on lap 18 when he missed the turn into the inner loop, and was forced to come to a complete stop; as a result, Larson fell back to 38th. Two laps later, David Ragan and Boris Said blew the entrance to the inner loop and fell back in the running order. Alex Bowman spun in turn six and got back going again without bringing out the caution. Kyle Busch made his first stop on lap 24 and left his pit box with the fuel can stuck on the car; he served a stop-and-go penalty for removing equipment from the pit box.

Second half
Joey Logano served a pass-through penalty for his crew going over the wall too soon on lap 28. Kyle Busch made his third stop in four laps for a flat tire on lap 29, while Marcos Ambrose gave up second place to make his first stop of the race. Gordon made his first stop on lap 30, passing the lead to teammate Kasey Kahne. Kahne gave up the lead on lap 33 to pit and gave the lead to Ambrose. Gordon began losing power going down the back stretch and brought out the second caution of the race on lap 51. Ambrose came in to pit during the caution and Jimmie Johnson took the lead for the restart on lap 55.

Big wreck
The third caution of the race flew on lap 56 for a crash in the outer loop, a lap later, where the race was red flagged to ensue cleanup on the track. Greg Biffle drifted into the runoff area on the exit of turn 5 and came across the front of Ryan Newman. Newman's car got turned and hit the Armco barrier on the right-hand side, before turning back towards traffic. Newman's rear of the car then barely clipped McDowell in the right-rear. McDowell's rear wheel housing broke off, the car then bounced twice in the air and then punctured a hole in the Armco barrier on the left side of the track, beyond the exit of The Boot where it send McDowell on his side for a brief second before he came back upright. Bowman and Danica Patrick also took damage in the wreck, while the red flag was lifted temporarily to bring the field down the front stretch.

In a post-race interview with ESPN reporter Vince Welch, Newman was highly critical of the circuit, in regards to the Armco barriers, the damage that was caused by his car and the car of McDowell, as well as its "antiquated" safety features. Upon his return to pit road, McDowell also spoke with Welch, stating that "it seems like when I do it they are usually fairly big", referring to a previous crash that he had suffered at the 2008 Samsung 500, at Texas Motor Speedway. He also stated that he "didn't really have time to adjust or move, I just tried not to hit Ryan in the door there. I was along for the ride".

The race was red flagged for 81 minutes while the Armco barriers were repaired, and as the cars started running again, Carl Edwards stayed out when the leaders came in to pit. The race restarted with 31 laps to go, and A. J. Allmendinger took the lead from Edwards with 30 laps to go. Casey Mears got turned in the inner loop with 18 laps to go, before the caution flew for the fourth time with 13 laps to go, after Josh Wise stalled in the inner loop. Allmendinger led the way on the restart with nine laps to go, but the fifth caution came out very quickly when Jimmie Johnson got turned in turn 1 and made contact with Regan Smith, while Justin Allgaier was also collected.

Finish

The race restarted with five laps to go. Ambrose took the lead immediately thereafter, following a side-by-side battle with Allmendinger. The sixth caution period came out the following lap, when Denny Hamlin spun and crashed into the gravel-filled barrels at the entrance to pit road. In a non-connected incident, Alex Kennedy hit the wall on the exit of turn one, to bring out the sixth caution, the race was red flagged for a second time. Following a delay of around 20 minutes, the race restarted, and Allmendinger held off a hard charging Ambrose with two laps to go to score his first career Sprint Cup Series victory. Upon exiting his car, Allmendinger expressed his delight at the result, stating he could not "believe we've won a NASCAR Sprint Cup race", before congratulating his entire JTG Daugherty Racing team, expressing "with this whole 47 team, [team owners] Tad Geschickter, Jody Geschickter, Brad Daugherty, all the great sponsors we have, our first Cup victory together, my first victory...I love these guys. I just wanted it so bad for them and this team. They work so hard. I wasn't gonna let Marcos take that from me". Ambrose recorded his sixth top-three finish in Sprint Cup races at Watkins Glen, but praised the performance of his late-race rival, Allmendinger. "First of all, congratulations to A. J. and the 47 team. They deserved that win. I left nothing on the table. I tried to rattle his cage and couldn't shake him. We raced fair and square to the end there. It was a tough couple laps but it was fair. We were both giving it to each other pretty hard. No harm, no foul. We just came up a little short".

Post race penalties
On Wednesday, August 13, Kevin Harvick's team was penalized for a rules infraction due to the bean bag that forced Harvick to make an unscheduled stop on lap 4, in order for the object to be removed. The infraction was levied as a P3 level penalty, outlined in Section 12-4.3 of the 2014 rule book:

• A. Violation examples could include but are not limited to:

• 1(c): Unapproved added weight and/or weight affixed improperly (e.g. Unapproved added weight (size and material)); unapproved added weight location, but not of a nature rising to a higher numbered penalty.

The infraction violates the following sections in the rule book:

• 12-1: Actions detrimental to stock car racing;
• 20-2.3: Added car weight

• A. Any weight added to the car must be bolted inside the body shell in an approved weight container and in a position acceptable to NASCAR officials

• Added weight must be in block form of not less than five pound blocks (no pellets) and painted white with the car number or team identification permanently legible on it.

As a result, crew chief Rodney Childers was fined $25,000.

Race summary
 Lead changes: 7 
 Cautions: 6 for 17 laps
 Red flags: 2 for 1 hour, 42 minutes and 41 seconds
 Time of race: 2 hours, 26 minutes and 48 seconds
 Average speed:

Race results

Media

Television

Radio

Standings after the race

Drivers' Championship standings

Manufacturers' Championship standings

Note: Only the first sixteen positions are included for the driver standings.

Notes

References

Cheez-It 355 at The Glen
Cheez-It 355 at The Glen
Cheez-It 355 at The Glen
NASCAR races at Watkins Glen International